On June 5, alleged Fulani militants killed thirty-two civilians in four villages in the Kajuru area of Kaduna State, Nigeria.

Prelude 
In the villages where the attack took place, attacks by Fulani militiamen were not a new occurrence. Prior to the attack, bandits abducted 14 people from a train station at the town of Idon, also in the Kajuru area.

Attack 
According to locals, the militants attacked four villages in the Kajuru area - Ugwan Gamu, Dogon Noma, Ungwan Sarki, and Maikori. The attack began around noon on June 5, where around 450 militants militants stormed Dogon Noma and Ungwan Gamu on 150 motorcycles, burning down houses and gathering people out of their homes. Some residents in Maikori began to fight back against the militants when they heard the news, which initially worked, although a "white-painted helicopter", which the civilians believed was coming to their aid, began to gun down the villagers fighting back. The helicopter however, did not gun down fleeing residents. After killing around 32 residents in Dogon Noma and Ungwan Sarki, the bandits made their way to Maikori, where the population fled as the bandits burned down houses and killed one person. The village of Maikori was burned to the grouned, and Ungwan Sarki was partially destroyed. The bandits began to disperse around 6pm.

Aftermath 
The Kajuru attack occurred on the same day as a massacre at a church in Owo, Nigeria. Leaders in the Adara community, where the villages are located, corroborated claims of the helicopter attack, although this was denied by the Nigerian government.

In the following days, the death toll rose from 25 to 32 killed in Dogon Noma, as bodies were being discovered in the forests nearby. Many of the people killed were men, with 16 men, 5 women, and 4 children being counted.

References 

Kaduna
Attacks in Nigeria in 2022
Nigerian bandit conflict
Massacres in 2022
Massacres in Nigeria
June 2022 events in Africa

Mass murder in 2022
Mass murder in Nigeria